The 1961–62 daytime network television schedule for the three major English-language commercial broadcast networks in the United States covers the weekday daytime hours from September 1961 to August 1962.

Talk shows are highlighted in yellow, local programming is white, reruns of prime-time programming are orange, game shows are pink, soap operas are chartreuse, news programs are gold and all others are light blue. New series are highlighted in bold.

Monday-Friday
{| class=wikitable style="font-size:90%"
! width="1.5%" bgcolor="#C0C0C0" colspan="2"|Network
!width="13%" bgcolor="#C0C0C0"|6:00 am
!width="14%" bgcolor="#C0C0C0"|6:30 am
!width="13%" bgcolor="#C0C0C0"|7:00 am
!width="14%" bgcolor="#C0C0C0"|7:30 am
!width="13%" bgcolor="#C0C0C0"|8:00 am
!width="14%" bgcolor="#C0C0C0"|8:30 am
!width="13%" bgcolor="#C0C0C0"|9:00 am
!width="14%" bgcolor="#C0C0C0"|9:30 am
!width="13%" bgcolor="#C0C0C0"|10:00 am
!width="14%" bgcolor="#C0C0C0"|10:30 am
!width="13%" bgcolor="#C0C0C0"|11:00 am
!width="14%" bgcolor="#C0C0C0"|11:30 am
!width="13%" bgcolor="#C0C0C0"|noon
!width="14%" bgcolor="#C0C0C0"|12:30 pm
!width="13%" bgcolor="#C0C0C0"|1:00 pm
!width="14%" bgcolor="#C0C0C0"|1:30 pm
!width="13%" bgcolor="#C0C0C0"|2:00 pm
!width="14%" bgcolor="#C0C0C0"|2:30 pm
!width="13%" bgcolor="#C0C0C0"|3:00 pm
!width="14%" bgcolor="#C0C0C0"|3:30 pm
!width="13%" bgcolor="#C0C0C0"|4:00 pm
!width="14%" bgcolor="#C0C0C0"|4:30 pm
!width="13%" bgcolor="#C0C0C0"|5:00 pm
!width=14% bgcolor=#C0C0C0|5:30 pm
!width=13% bgcolor=#C0C0C0|6:00 pm
!width=14% bgcolor=#C0C0C0|6:30 pm
|-
!bgcolor="#C0C0C0" rowspan=6|ABC
! bgcolor=#C0C0C0|Fall
|bgcolor="white" colspan="10" rowspan=6|local 
|bgcolor="orange" rowspan=3|The Texan 
|bgcolor="orange"|Love that Bob  (to 12/1)
|bgcolor="pink" rowspan=6|Camouflage 
|bgcolor="pink" rowspan=3|Make a Face
|bgcolor="lightblue" rowspan=2|Day in Court
|bgcolor="white" rowspan=2|local
|bgcolor="pink" rowspan=2|Number Please
|bgcolor="pink" rowspan=6|Seven Keys
|bgcolor="pink" rowspan=6|Queen for a Day
|bgcolor="pink" rowspan=6|Who Do You Trust?
|bgcolor="yellow" colspan="2" rowspan=6|4:00 pm: American Bandstand
4:50 pm: American Newsstand
|bgcolor="white" rowspan=6 colspan=2|local 
|bgcolor=gold rowspan=6|ABC Evening Report6:15: local
|bgcolor=white rowspan=6|local
|-
! bgcolor=#C0C0C0|December
|bgcolor=pink rowspan=5|Yours for a Song (from 12/4)
|-
! bgcolor=#C0C0C0|Winter
|bgcolor=white colspan=2|local
|bgcolor=lightblue rowspan=4|Day in Court
|-
! bgcolor=#C0C0C0|Spring
|bgcolor=yellow rowspan=3|The Tennessee Ernie Ford Show
|bgcolor=pink rowspan=2|Window Shopping
|bgcolor=orange|The Texan  (to 5/11)
|bgcolor=white|local
|-
! bgcolor=#C0C0C0|May
|bgcolor=white colspan=2 rowspan=2|local
|-
! bgcolor=#C0C0C0|Summer
|bgcolor=orange|Jane Wyman Presents 
|-
!bgcolor="#C0C0C0" rowspan=3|CBS
! bgcolor=#C0C0C0|Fall
|bgcolor="white" colspan="4" rowspan=3|local 
|bgcolor="bf9fef" colspan="2" rowspan=3|Captain Kangaroo
|bgcolor="white" colspan="2" rowspan=3|local 
|bgcolor="gold" rowspan=3|Calendar
|bgcolor="orange" rowspan=3|I Love Lucy 
|bgcolor="pink" rowspan=2|Video Village
|bgcolor="pink"|11:30 am: Your Surprise Package (to 2/23) & 11:55 am: CBS Newsbreak with Rose Marie Scott
|bgcolor="chartreuse" rowspan=3|Love of Life                                                  
|bgcolor="chartreuse" rowspan=3|12:30 pm: Search for Tomorrow
12:45 pm: The Guiding Light
|bgcolor="white" rowspan=3|local 
|bgcolor="chartreuse" rowspan=3|As the World Turns
|bgcolor="pink" rowspan=3|Password
|bgcolor="yellow" rowspan=3|Art Linkletter's House Party
|bgcolor="orange" rowspan=3|The Millionaire 
|bgcolor="lightblue" rowspan=2|3:30 pm: The Verdict is Yours
3:55 pm: CBS Newsbreak with Rose Marie Scott
|bgcolor="chartreuse" rowspan=2|4:00 pm: The Brighter Day
4:15 pm: The Secret Storm
|bgcolor="chartreuse" rowspan=3|The Edge of Night
|bgcolor="white" rowspan=3 colspan=4|local 
|-
! bgcolor=#C0C0C0|February
|bgcolor=chartreuse|11:30 am: The Clear Horizon (from 2/26) & 11:55 am: CBS Newsbreak with Rose Marie Scott
|-
! bgcolor=#C0C0C0|June
|bgcolor=lightblue|The Verdict is Yours
|bgcolor=chartreuse|11:30 am: The Brighter Day & 11:55 am: CBS Newsbreak with Rose Marie Scott
|bgcolor=pink|3:30 pm: To Tell the Truth
3:55 pm: CBS Newsbreak with Rose Marie Scott'|bgcolor=chartreuse|The Secret Storm
|-
!bgcolor="#C0C0C0" rowspan=3|NBC
! bgcolor=#C0C0C0|Fall
|bgcolor="lightblue" colspan="2" rowspan=3|Continental Classroom
|bgcolor="gold" colspan="4" rowspan=3|Today
|bgcolor="white" colspan="2" rowspan=3|local 
|bgcolor="pink" rowspan=3|Say When!!
|bgcolor="pink" rowspan=3|Play Your Hunch In COLOR
|bgcolor="pink" rowspan=3|The Price Is Right In COLOR
|bgcolor="pink" rowspan=3|Concentration
|bgcolor="pink"|Truth or Consequences In COLOR
|bgcolor="pink"|12:30 pm: It Could Be You In COLOR
12:55 pm: NBC News
|bgcolor="white" colspan="2" rowspan=3|local
|bgcolor="pink" rowspan=3|The Jan Murray Show In COLOR
|bgcolor="orange" rowspan=3|The Loretta Young Theater 
|bgcolor="chartreuse" rowspan=3|Young Doctor Malone
|bgcolor="chartreuse"|From These Roots
|bgcolor="orange" rowspan=3|Make Room for Daddy 
|bgcolor="yellow" rowspan=3|4:30 pm: Here's Hollywood
4:55 pm: NBC News
|bgcolor="lightblue" rowspan=2|5:00 pm: Kukla, Fran and Ollie5:05 pm: local 
|bgcolor=white colspan=3 rowspan=2|local
|-
! bgcolor=#C0C0C0|Winter
|bgcolor=pink rowspan=2|Your First Impression In COLOR
|bgcolor=pink rowspan=2|12:30 pm: Truth or Consequences In COLOR
12:55 pm: NBC News
|bgcolor=chartreuse rowspan=2|Our Five Daughters''|-
! bgcolor=#C0C0C0|Spring
|bgcolor=white colspan=4|local
|}

Saturday

Sunday

See also
1961-62 United States network television schedule (prime-time)
1961-62 United States network television schedule (late night)

Sources
Castleman & Podrazik, The TV Schedule Book, McGraw-Hill Paperbacks, 1984
Hyatt, The Encyclopedia Of Daytime Television, Billboard Books, 1997
TV schedules, NEW YORK TIMES''', September 1961-September 1962 (microfilm)

United States weekday network television schedules
1961 in American television
1962 in American television